Giv'at Shmuel is a city in the Center District of Israel. It is located in the eastern part of the Gush Dan Metropolitan Area and bordered by Ramat Gan and Bnei Brak to the West, Kiryat Ono to the South and Petah Tikva to the East and North.

History

Giv'at Shmuel was founded in 1944. It was named for the Romanian Zionist leader Samuel Pineles, founder and president of the Zionist Congress in Focșani and Vice-President of the First Zionist Congress in Basel.  On November 5, 2007, the Israeli Minister of Interior accepted a committee recommendation to change the municipal status of Giv'at Shmuel to 'city'.

Demographics
At the end of 2019, the population of Givat Shmuel numbered 26,578 with a growth rate of 2.1%, and with the building of new neighborhoods is planned to grow to 40,000. Demographics are mixed religious/secular, with a socioeconomic standing of 8/10.

Amongst immigrants from English-speaking countries, Giv'at Shmuel is home to Israel's largest community of lone immigrants, at approximately 950 students, young professionals, newly married couples and young families. It also has the highest rate of "successful aliyah" - the number of immigrants who remain in Israel after 5 years - in the country. Since 2013, Nefesh B'Nefesh has organized  various events and activities, and works with the local authorities  to expand programming.  The GSC - Givat Shmuel Community (R.A.) was formed, creating an infrastructural backbone for English-speaking activities in the area.

Education
 Daycare and preschool education: In 2020–2021, there were 45 public preschools (secular and national-religious, special-ed and regular education, and a Montessori option) and many private preschools and daycares.
 Primary education: There are two secular primary schools, Yigal Alon and Ben Gurion, and three national-religious primary school, Moreshet Zvulun, Moreshet Menachem, and Moreshet Neria.
 Secondary education: There is a secular co-ed high school, Tichon Givat Shmuel, and two national-religious high schools: Ulpnanat Amit for girls and Yeshivat Bnei Akiva for boys. Some residents commute to high schools outside of the city as well. In 2019-20, 96.5% of the high school students in Giv'at Shmuel completed their bagrut (high school matriculation) certification.[5]
 Higher education: Adjacent to the South-Western edge of Giv'at Shmuel is the campus of Bar Ilan University. While technically in Ramat Gan, the campus has been expanding in recent years to the effect that it now separates (and connects) the southern Ramat Ilan neighbourhood of Giv'at Shmuel from the rest of the city.

Healthcare
Giv'at Shmuel is served by Mayanei Hayeshua Medical Center in nearby Bnei Brak.

Sports
Maccabi Habik'a, formerly Elitzur Givat Shmuel, is a basketball team that played in Ligat HaAl, the top division of Israeli basketball, until relegation in 2007. The team reached the State Cup final in 2003, but lost to Maccabi Tel Aviv.

In 2010, an annual  race was inaugurated with 350 runners from all over the country.

Landmarks
A leisure and sports center was established on an area of about 32 dunams (8 acres) in northeastern Giv'at Shmuel which incorporates tennis courts, fitness rooms, swimming pools, a roller skating rink, a cafeteria and other services, along with water park, covering an area of about 5 dunams (1.25 acre).

In the center of town there is a park named after the Israeli astronaut, Ilan Ramon who died in the Space Shuttle Columbia disaster.

Twin towns – sister cities

 Dubna, Russia
 Gołdap, Poland
 Stade, Germany

Notable people 
Levana Moshon (born 1952), writer, journalist, teacher and children's storyteller

Gallery

References

External links
 "Givat Shmuel news"
 
 "Municipality of Givat Shmuel" - The Official Site
 "The First Givat Shmuel Running Race"
  Film about "Day of Joy" in Givat Shmuel 
 www.nbn.org.il 
 The GSC - Givat Shmuel Community (R.A.)
 "About Givat Shmuel"

Cities in Israel
Cities in Central District (Israel)